The ethmoid sinuses or ethmoid air cells of the ethmoid bone are one of the four paired paranasal sinuses. Unlike the other three pairs of paranasal sinuses which consist of one or two large cavities, the ethmoidal sinuses entail a number of small air-filled cavities ("air cells"). The cells are located within the lateral mass (labyrinth) of each ethmoid bone and are variable in both size and number. The cells are grouped into anterior, middle, and posterior groups; the groups differ in their drainage modalities.

Structure
The ethmoid air cells consist of numerous thin-walled cavities in the ethmoidal labyrinth. They lie between the upper parts of the nasal cavities and the orbits, and are separated from these cavities by thin bony lamellae.

The groups of the ethmoidal air cells drain into the nasal meatuses.
 The posterior group the posterior ethmoidal sinus drains into the superior meatus above the middle nasal concha; sometimes one or more opens into the sphenoidal sinus.
 The anterior group the anterior ethmoidal sinus drains into the middle meatus of the nose by way of the infundibulum.

The two groups are divided by the basal lamella. This is one of the bony divisions of the ethmoid bone and is mostly contained inside the ethmoid labyrinth. Medially the lamella becomes the bony part of the middle concha.

Haller cells 
Haller cells are infraorbital ethmoidal air cells lateral to the lamina papyracea. These may arise from the anterior or posterior ethmoidal sinuses.

Innervation 
The ethmoidal air cells receive sensory fibers from the anterior and posterior ethmoidal nerves, and the orbital branches of the pterygopalatine ganglion, which carry the postganglionic parasympathetic nerve fibers for mucous secretion from the facial nerve.

Development 
The ethmoidal cells (sinuses) and maxillary sinuses are present at birth.

Clinical significance
Acute ethmoiditis in childhood and ethmoidal carcinoma may spread superiorly causing meningitis and cerebrospinal fluid leakage or it may spread laterally into the orbit causing proptosis and diplopia.

Additional images

References

External links
 
 

Bones of the head and neck